Cory Finley is an American screenwriter, playwright, and director. Finley wrote and directed the black comedy film Thoroughbreds, which premiered at Sundance Film Festival in 2017. He also directed the true crime dramedy film Bad Education starring Hugh Jackman and Allison Janney, which premiered on HBO and won the Primetime Emmy Award for Outstanding Television Movie in 2020. Finley was raised in St. Louis and attended Yale College.

Filmography

Films

Television

References

External links
 

Year of birth missing (living people)
Living people
Artists from St. Louis
Film directors from Missouri
Screenwriters from Missouri
Writers from St. Louis
Yale College alumni